Specklinia grobyi is a species of orchid broadly distributed from southern Mexico through most of northern South America. It was formerly placed in the genera Humboltia, Lepanthes, Pabstiella, and Pleurothallis.

References

grobyi
Orchids of Central America
Orchids of Belize